Juan de la Sal (died 14 January 1630) was a Roman Catholic prelate who served as Auxiliary Bishop of Seville (1603–1630) and Titular Bishop of Hippo Diarrhytus (1603–1630).

Biography
On 22 October 1603, Juan de la Sal was appointed during the papacy of Pope Clement VIII as Auxiliary Bishop of Seville and Titular Bishop of Hippo Diarrhytus. In 1603, he was consecrated bishop by Fernando Niño de Guevara, Archbishop of Seville. He served as Auxiliary Bishop of Seville until his death on 14 January 1630.

While bishop, he was the principal co-consecrator of Arcangelo Gualtieri, Archbishop of Monreale (1612); Martín Fernández Portocarrero, Bishop of Ciudad Rodrigo (1624); and Fernando Andrade Sotomayor, Bishop of Palencia (1628).

References

External links and additional sources
 (for Chronology of Bishops) 
 (for Chronology of Bishops) 

1630 deaths
17th-century Roman Catholic bishops in Spain
Bishops appointed by Pope Clement VIII
University of Salamanca alumni